The San Antonio Force were a professional arena football team based in San Antonio, Texas. The team was a member of the Arena Football League that competed in the 1992 season only. The team owner of the Force was Red McCombs. The team's colors were black, red and silver.

History

The Force played their home games at HemisFair Arena, then the home of the San Antonio Spurs. They set two records for futility, becoming the first arena football team ever to be shut out in a game, losing to the Orlando Predators 50–0 on June 13, 1992, and the all-time lowest record for field goal percentage in a season, 11.8% (4–34), among three different kickers. The team ceased operations upon the completion of the season, citing that there were not enough available dates at HemisFair Arena or the Alamodome for the team to host games. There was an attempt by Marc Reich to bring the team to Hartford, Connecticut, but he was unable to convince the city to purchase the rights to the Force, as it was believed there wasn't a high enough return on investment. Arena football returned to San Antonio in 2012 when the Tulsa Talons franchise relocated to the Alamodome.

Notable players

Final roster

Head coaches

Season results

Media
 The team appeared on the game EA Sports Arena Football as a hidden bonus team.
 The first player drafted in 1992 by the Force was OL/DL David A. Caldwell, who was second on the team with 5.0 sacks. Caldwell is a San Antonio resident and currently coaching football in San Antonio ISD.

References

External links
 San Antonio Force at ArenaFan.com

 
Defunct Arena Football League teams
American football teams established in 1992
American football teams disestablished in 1992
1992 establishments in Texas
1992 disestablishments in Texas
Arena Football League in Texas
Defunct American football teams in Texas